Twell and Twells are English surnames. Notable persons with one of these names include:
Ben Twell (1903–1986), English footballer
Stephanie Twell (born 1989), British runner
Terry Twell (1947–2013), English footballer
Edward Twells (1823–1898), Bishop of Bloemfontein in South Africa
Henry Twells (1823–1900), Anglican clergyman, hymn writer and poet
Leonard Twells (1684?–1742), English cleric and theological writer